Bledian Krasniqi (born 17 June 2001) is a Swiss professional footballer who plays as midfielder for Swiss Super League club FC Zürich.

Club career
On 29 November 2018, Krasniqi made his professional debut against AEK Larnaca in UEFA Europa League. On 20 June 2019, it was confirmed that Krasniqi had been loaned out to FC Wil for the 2019–20 season.

International career
Krasniqi was born in Switzerland to Kosovan Parents, and holding both passports. He is a youth international for Switzerland.

References

External links
Bledian Krasniqi at SVF

Living people
2001 births
Footballers from Zürich
Swiss men's footballers
Kosovan footballers
Association football midfielders
Switzerland youth international footballers
Switzerland under-21 international footballers
FC Zürich players
FC Wil players
Swiss Super League players
Swiss Challenge League players